Peyk or Peik or Pik in Iran, may refer to:
 Peyk, East Azerbaijan
 Peyk, Markazi